The Philippine House Committee on Public Works and Highways, or House Public Works and Highways Committee is a standing committee of the Philippine House of Representatives.

Jurisdiction 
As prescribed by House Rules, the committee's jurisdiction is on the planning, construction, maintenance, improvement and repair of public infrastructure which includes the following:
 Buildings
 Bridges
 Drainage
 Highways
 Flood control and protection
 Parks
 Roads
 Water utilities and utilization of waters of the public domain

Members, 18th Congress

Historical members

18th Congress

Vice Chairperson 
 Francisco Datol Jr. (SENIOR CITIZENS)

Members for the Majority 
 Marissa Andaya (Camarines Sur–1st, NPC)
 Bernardita Ramos (Sorsogon–2nd, NPC)

See also 
 House of Representatives of the Philippines
 List of Philippine House of Representatives committees
 Department of Public Works and Highways

Notes

References

External links 
House of Representatives of the Philippines

Public Works
Infrastructure in the Philippines